Paul Antoine Aristide Montel (29 April 1876 – 22 January 1975) was a French mathematician. He was born in Nice, France and died in Paris, France. He researched mostly on holomorphic functions in complex analysis.

Montel was a student of Émile Borel at the Sorbonne. Henri Cartan, Jean Dieudonné and Miron Nicolescu were among his students.

Montel's most important contribution to mathematics was the introduction and systematic
development of the
notion of normal family.
This very influential book also contains the first exposition in the book form of the results of Pierre Fatou and Gaston Julia on
holomorphic dynamics. The notion of normal family was a predecessor of the notion of compact space introduced by Pavel Alexandrov and Pavel Urysohn in 1929.

Notes

References
 

1876 births
1975 deaths
19th-century French mathematicians
20th-century French mathematicians
École Normale Supérieure alumni
University of Paris alumni
Members of the French Academy of Sciences
Grand Officiers of the Légion d'honneur